Say No to Death (1951) is a novel by Australian writer Dymphna Cusack.

Story outline

Set in Sydney following the war, the novel follows the medical journey of Jan, a young woman suffering from tuberculosis, and her struggles to gain any help from a Government health service struggling for funds.

Critical reception

A reviewer in The Age was impressed by the novel: "'A novel built entirely around a social injustice is a rarity, but with competence and courage Dymphna Cusack, in Say No to Death, has presented the subject of the tuberculosis patient and, in a story of heroism, pathos and great sympathy, put the case for the sick civilian at the mercy of a Government — a Government and a people — who respond to the needs of the scourge of war so much more readily than to the scourge of illness...This is a book well worth reading, as much for the story as for the message it carries."

A reviewer in The Mercury had a similar view: "In painting her characters all typically Australian - Miss Cusack has reached unusual literary heights. She shows a deep knowledge of the vagaries of human nature. The unexpected, courageous ending gives the final touch to a novel which must rank high in Australian literature."

See also

 1951 in Australian literature

References

Novels by Dymphna Cusack
1951 Australian novels